Chorsia is a genus of moths of the family Erebidae. The genus was erected by Francis Walker in 1863.

Species
Chorsia albicincta (Hampson, 1898) Khasis
Chorsia albiscripta (Hampson, 1898) Sri Lanka, southern India, Japan, Borneo
Chorsia aroa (Bethune-Baker, 1908) New Guinea, Seram
Chorsia bellissima (Draudt, 1950) Yunnan
Chorsia brewini Holloway, 2005 Borneo
Chorsia carjacobsi Holloway, 2005 Borneo
Chorsia colyeri Holloway, 2005 Borneo
Chorsia costimacula (Oberthür, 1880) Askold, Korea, Japan
Chorsia decolorata (Holloway, 1989) Borneo
Chorsia dinglei Holloway, 2005 Borneo
Chorsia greenleavesi Holloway, 2005 Borneo
Chorsia griffini Holloway, 2005 Borneo
Chorsia hemicyclopis (Hampson, 1926) Thailand, Borneo
Chorsia hemmingi Holloway, 2005 Borneo
Chorsia inordinata (Walker, [1863]) Borneo, India (Meghalaya)
Chorsia japonica (Warren, 1912) Japan
Chorsia kingi Holloway, 2005 Borneo
Chorsia maculosa Walker, [1863] Borneo
Chorsia mollicula (Graeser, [1889]) Amur, Korea, Japan
Chorsia noloides (Butler, 1879) Korea, Japan, Taiwan
Chorsia octosema (Hampson, 1926) Borneo
Chorsia perversa (Walker, 1862) Borneo, Sri Lanka
Chorsia picatum (Butler, 1892) Borneo
Chorsia rectilinea (Ueda, 1987) Taiwan, Korea
Chorsia rogersi Holloway, 2005 Borneo
Chorsia rufitincta (Hampson, 1918) Borneo
Chorsia sugii (Tanaka, 1973) Japan
Chorsia trichocera (Hampson, 1926) Philippines (Luzon)
Chorsia trigona (Hampson, 1891) southern India
Chorsia williamsi Holloway, 2005 Borneo

References

Calpinae